Warilla is a seaside suburb of the City of Shellharbour, Australia within the Wollongong urban area. It is one of the more established areas and is between the suburbs of Mount Warrigal in the west, Barrack Heights and Barrack Point in the south and Lake Illawarra in the north.

History
Warilla was officially granted township status in 1951. It is predominantly a residential suburb with many of the houses being built in the 1950s and 1960s. Warilla's main commercial centre is located on George Street with surrounding shops located on Lake Entrance Road and Shellharbour Road, where Warilla Grove Shopping Centre is also situated. Warilla is also blessed with fine beaches which are very popular with locals and tourist especially in summer.

Warilla held the council chambers for Shellharbour City Council from 1969 to 1991 when it relocated to the nearby Shellharbour City Centre. The building, which is still in good condition, is still used for council meetings. Other businesses have also set up inside.

There are two high schools—Lake Illawarra High School and Warilla High School (located in Warilla and Barrack Heights) and two public schools—Warilla North and Warilla Public School.

Rugby league
The Warilla-Lake South Gorillas are the local rugby league club. They are based at Cec Glenholmes Oval in Lake Illawarra and they play in the South Coast Group 7 Rugby Leaguecompetition.

Cricket
The Warilla Sports Cricket Club is based at Oakley Park and plays in the South Coast District cricket competition.

Notable people
Alexander Volkanovski, mixed martial artist, current UFC Featherweight Champion.

References

City of Shellharbour